Cynthia Jennifer "Cici" Denzler (born May 12, 1983 in Santa Ana, California) is a Colombian–American–Swiss alpine skier. She competed for Colombia at the 2010 Winter Olympics in the women's slalom and giant slalom skiing competitions. Denzler was the first athlete to represent Colombia at the Winter Olympic Games.

Personal life
Denzler was born in Santa Ana, California, on May 12, 1983. Her parents are Swiss. Denzler and her parents moved to Switzerland, where she still lives, when she was four years old. Denzler began skiing when she was eight years old.

Denzler's father, who is also her coach, first arrived to Colombia in 2000 to open a clothes factory. Denzler acquired her Colombian citizenship through her father's residence and activities in Colombia.

She is a graduate of California Coast University.

Denzler's nickname is "Cici". She gained this nickname from a Swiss nanny who found that she could not pronounce Cynthia and decided to call Denzler "Cici" instead.

Skiing career

United States
Denzler debuted internationally for the USA as an alpine skier in 1998.

Colombia
Denzler started representing Colombia from 2008. In 2010, Cynthia Denzler competed as part of Colombia's Winter Olympics delegation which consisted of her father Hanspeter, and his brother Fabian, both of which served as coaches. Cynthia Denzler said, "it is an honour to compete for Colombia and I am happy to do so. Representing the country during the Winter Olympics is a good thing and a dream come true." She carried the Colombian flag at the opening ceremony.

Alpine skiing results
All results are sourced from the International Ski Federation (FIS).

Olympic results

World Championship results

See also
Colombia at the 2010 Winter Olympics

References

External links

Colombian Ski Team
Cynthia's Page at McBoard | Paragon Sport

1983 births
Living people
Sportspeople from Santa Ana, California
Swiss female alpine skiers
American female alpine skiers
Colombian female alpine skiers
Naturalized citizens of Colombia
Colombian people of Swiss descent
American people of Swiss descent
Olympic alpine skiers of Colombia
Alpine skiers at the 2010 Winter Olympics
California Coast University alumni
21st-century American women